Lajos Nemes Kovács (born 27 April 1894, date of death unknown) was a Hungarian footballer and manager from Budapest. He had a career as a footballing manager in Italy at clubs such as Roma, Bologna and Alessandria.

References

External links
 

1894 births
Year of death missing
Footballers from Budapest
Hungarian footballers
Hungarian expatriate footballers
Novara F.C. players
MTK Budapest FC players
Serie B players
Expatriate footballers in Italy
Hungarian football managers
VfB Stuttgart managers
Calcio Padova managers
A.S. Roma managers
Bologna F.C. 1909 managers
U.S. Triestina Calcio 1918 managers
U.S. Alessandria Calcio 1912 managers
Cagliari Calcio managers
Expatriate football managers in Germany
Expatriate football managers in Italy
Hungarian expatriate football managers
Association football midfielders
Hungary international footballers